
Bellavista Lake (Bellavista qucha, Laguna Bellavista) is a lake in the San Ignacio de Velasco Municipality, José Miguel de Velasco Province, Santa Cruz Department, Bolivia. At an elevation of 200 m, its surface area is 24.8 km².

Lakes of Santa Cruz Department (Bolivia)